John Rock may refer to:
John Rock (abolitionist) (1825–1866), American abolitionist
John Rock (nurseryman) (1836-1904), owner of the California Nursery Company
John Rock (scientist) (1890–1984), co-inventor of the birth control pill
John Rock, an alias of Danish singer Jon Nørgaard (born 1985)
Johns Rock, a hazard to shipping in Danish Waters

See also
 Rock (name)